Wallace Sproule (17 April 1891 – 10 May 1957) was an Irish first-class cricketer.

Early life 
Sproule was born at Killyleagh in County Down, and was educated at The Royal School, Armagh. After completing his secondary education Sproule went up to Trinity College, Dublin in 1909. He played his club cricket for Dublin University, who regularly played host to English county opposition.

Career 
He served in the British Army with the infantry during World War I, where he held the rank of Second Lieutenant in August 1915. Emerging unscathed from the war, Sproule made a single appearance in first-class cricket for Ireland against Scotland at Dublin in 1923. 

In Scotland's first-innings, he took 4 wickets with his fast-medium bowling, to finish with innings figures of 4/64; he followed this up with figures of 2/19 in Scotland's second-innings. Batting twice in the match, he was dismissed by John Christie in Ireland's first-innings for a single run, while in their second-innings he was dismissed without scoring by Gilbert Hole. He later played club cricket for Downpatrick, Dungannon, North of Ireland, and Bangor. He died at Belfast in May 1957, predeceasing his wife, Elizabeth, by twenty years.

References

External links

1891 births
1957 deaths
People from Killyleagh
People educated at The Royal School, Armagh
Alumni of Trinity College Dublin
British Army personnel of World War I
Cricketers from Northern Ireland
Irish cricketers